"Far Away" is a song co-written and performed by American neo soul group Kindred the Family Soul, issued as the only official single from their debut album Surrender to Love. The song peaked at #53 on the Billboard R&B chart in 2003.

Music video

The official music video for the song was directed by Jeff Kennedy.

Chart positions

References

External links
 
 

2003 songs
2003 debut singles
Hidden Beach Recordings singles
Kindred the Family Soul songs
Soul ballads
2000s ballads